Sergio Pininfarina, born Sergio Farina, (8 September 1926 – 3 July 2012) was an Italian automobile designer and Senator for life.

Biography

Automobile designer 
Pininfarina was born in Turin. After joining his father Battista Farina at Carrozzeria Pininfarina, he quickly became integral to the company and, during his career, oversaw many of the designs (particularly Ferraris) for which the company is famous. In 1961, by decree of the Italian president, his family surname was changed from Farina to Pininfarina to match that of the company.

In 1965 it was Sergio Pininfarina who personally persuaded Enzo Ferrari to adopt a "mid-engined" engine configuration for a new line of road cars, with the engine positioned behind the driver, but ahead of the rear wheels. The resulting concept car, Ferrari 365 P Berlinetta Speciale was presented at the Paris Motor Show in October, although it would be another two years before the cars were offered for sale.

After his father died in 1966, Pininfarina became chairman of the company.

In 2006 Sergio and his son Andrea, who died in 2008, were named Honorary Chairmen of Pininfarina.

Politics
Between 1979 and 1988, Pininfarina was a Liberal Party MEP, where his party was a part of the European Liberal Democrat alliance.

Senator for life 
On 23 September 2005 he was named Senator for life of the Italian Republic by Carlo Azeglio Ciampi (together with Giorgio Napolitano).

On 21 February 2007, he attended the vote in which the government motion on foreign policy was defeated in the Senate. Subsequently, he led to the resignation of then Prime Minister Romano Prodi. Pininfarina, who attended his first Senate assembly in nine months, cast an "abstain" vote, which helped the opposition forces to defeat the government's foreign policy. After the aforementioned tally Pininfarina did not ever vote in the assembly again.

Death 
Pininfarina died in Turin on 3 July 2012 aged 85.

References

http://www.pininfarina.com/media/files/il_gruppo/collaborazioni/pininfarina_azienda_storia_collaborazioni_peugeot_en.pdf

External links
 Biography at pininfarina.it

1926 births
2012 deaths
Automotive engineers from Turin
Politicians from Turin
Italian life senators
MEPs for Italy 1979–1984
Pininfarina people
Presidents of Confindustria
Compasso d'Oro Award recipients
Royal Designers for Industry